Huai Sai Nua railway station is a railway station located in Cha-am Subdistrict, Cha-am District, Phetchaburi.

Services 
 Ordinary 251/252 Bang Sue Junction-Prachuap Khiri Khan-Bang Sue Junction
 Ordinary 254/255 Lang Suan-Thon Buri-Lang Suan

References 

Railway stations in Thailand